This is a list of cities and towns in Cape Verde. In Cape Verde, there are two types of urban settlements: cities and towns. Since 2015, there are 24 cities and 19 towns. Every seat of a municipality has been designated a city.

Cities 
The following table shows the cities (cidades) of Cape Verde, with population data from 1990, 2000 and 2010.

Towns 
The following table shows the towns (vilas) of Cape Verde, with population data from 2010.

See also 
List of villages and settlements in Cape Verde

References

External links 
 Instituto Nacional de Estatistica de Cabo Verde
 World Gazetteer – Population of the towns and cities in Cape Verde

 
 
Cape Verde, List of cities in
Cape Verde
Cities